När mörkret faller may refer to:

 When Darkness Falls (1960 film)
 When Darkness Falls (2006 film)